Elba Township is one of twenty-one townships in Knox County, Illinois, USA.  As of the 2010 census, its population was 291 and it contained 124 housing units.  Its name was changed from Liberty Township on June 8, 1853.

Geography

Unincorporated towns
 Elba Center at 
 Eugene at 
(This list is based on USGS data and may include former settlements.)

Cemeteries
The township contains these four cemeteries: Catterton, Elba, Kightlinger and Pleasant Hill.

Demographics

School districts
 Farmington Central Community Unit School District 265
 Williamsfield Community Unit School District 210

Political districts
 Illinois's 17th congressional district
 State House District 74
 State Senate District 37

References
 
 United States Census Bureau 2009 TIGER/Line Shapefiles
 United States National Atlas

External links
 City-Data.com
 Illinois State Archives
 Township Officials of Illinois

Townships in Knox County, Illinois
Galesburg, Illinois micropolitan area
Townships in Illinois